James M. H. Lovegrove (born 1965) is a British writer of speculative fiction.

Early life
Lovegrove was educated at Radley College, Oxfordshire, and was one of the subjects of a 1979 BBC television series, Public School. A follow-up programme was broadcast on 27 October 2013, in which Lovegrove talked about his experiences of attending the school and about public school education in general. He later studied English literature at St Catherine's College, Oxford.

Career
Lovegrove's first novel was The Hope, published by Macmillan in 1990. He was nominated for the Arthur C. Clarke Award in 1998 for his novel Days and for the John W. Campbell Memorial Award in 2004 for his novel Untied Kingdom. His short story "Carry The Moon in My Pocket" won the 2011 Seiun Award in Japan for Best Foreign Language Short Story.

Lovegrove has written young adult fiction, most notably a series of fantasy novels, The Clouded World, under a pseudonym (Jay Amory). These have been translated into nine languages so far. He has also written a number of short novels published by Barrington Stoke, a company specialising in books for reluctant readers. Two of his titles for that company have been longlisted for the Manchester Book Award.

His recent Pantheon series is a set of standalone military science fiction adventure novels featuring the gods of ancient mythologies. Seven have been published so far: The Age of Ra, The Age of Zeus, The Age of Odin (a New York Times best seller), The Age of Aztec, Age of Voodoo, Age of Shiva, Age of Heroes and Age of Legends. In 2013, Lovegrove published an omnibus collecting three Pantheon novellas, entitled The Age of Godpunk.

As an illustrator, Lovegrove has executed design and poster work for Flying Pig Systems, makers of the Wholehog range of lighting control products, and drew the pictures for the Echo Beach line of postcards and T-shirts.

He has contributed reviews and journalism to magazines such as The Literary Review, Interzone, BBC MindGames Magazine and Comic Heroes, and has set cryptic crosswords to the weekend section of The Independent. Starting in 2007, he became a regular reviewer of fiction for the Financial Times, concentrating primarily on SF and children's fiction.

Since 2013 Lovegrove has begun publishing Sherlock Holmes pastiche novels for Titan Books, including a mash-up trilogy, Cthulhu Casebooks, that crosses over the literary worlds of Sir Arthur Conan Doyle and H.P. Lovecraft.

From 2018 he has also written Firefly novels for Titan Books. His first Firefly novel Big Damn Hero was nominated for the 2019 Dragon Award for Best Media Tie-In Novel and his third (The Ghost Machine) won the 2020 award in the same category. His second Firefly novel The Magnificent Nine was nominated for a 2020 Scribe Award (awarded by the International Association of Media Tie-in Writers) in the category Original Novel Speculative and his third Firefly novel The Ghost Machine was nominated for a 2021 Scribe Award in the same category.

Bibliography

Novels 
 The Hope, Macmillan 1990, 
 Days, Gollancz 1997, 
 Escardy Gap (with Peter Crowther), Earthlight/Tor 1998 
 The Foreigners, Gollancz 2000, 
 Untied Kingdom, Gollancz 2003, 
 Worldstorm, Gollancz 2004, 
 Provender Gleed, Gollancz 2005, 
 Better Life, CreateSpace Independent Publishing Platform, 2014, 
 The James Lovegrove Collection, Volume #1, REBCA, 2014,

Redlaw 
 Redlaw, Solaris Books, 2011, 
 Redlaw Red Eye, Solaris Books, 2012,

The Dev Harmer Missions 
 World of Fire, 2014, Solaris Books, 
 World of Water, 2016, Solaris,

The Pantheon Series 
 The Age of Ra, Solaris Books, 2009, 
 The Age of Zeus, Solaris Books, 2010, 
 The Age of Odin, Solaris Books, 2011, 
 Age of Aztec, Solaris Books, 2012, 
 Age of Godpunk, Solaris Books, 2013, 
 Age of Voodoo, Solaris Books, 2013, 
 Age of Shiva, Solaris Books, 2014, 
 Age of Heroes, Solaris Books, 2016, 
 Age of Legends, Solaris Books, 2019

Sherlock Holmes pastiches

The New Adventures of Sherlock Holmes 
 Sherlock Holmes: The Stuff of Nightmares, Titan Books 2013, 
 Sherlock Holmes: Gods of War, Titan Books 2014, 
 Sherlock Holmes: The Thinking Engine, Titan Books 2015, 
 Sherlock Holmes: The Labyrinth of Death, Titan Books 2017, 
 Sherlock Holmes: The Devil's Dust, Titan Books 2018, 
 Sherlock Holmes and the Christmas Demon, Titan Books 2019, 
 Sherlock Holmes and the Beast of the Stapletons, Titan Books, 2020, 
 Sherlock Holmes & The Three Winter Terrors, Titan Books, 2021,

The Cthulhu Casebooks 
 Sherlock Holmes and the Shadwell Shadows, Titan Books 2016, 
 Sherlock Holmes and the Miskatonic Monstrosities, Titan Books 2017, 
 Sherlock Holmes and the Sussex Sea-Devils, Titan Books 2018,

Sherlock Holmes Short Fiction 
 The Fallen Financier, in George Mann (ed.), Encounters of Sherlock Holmes, Titan Books, 2013, 
 The Innocent Icarus, in David Thomas Moore (ed.), Two Hundred and Twenty-One Baker Streets, Abaddon, 2014, 
 Pure Swank, in George Mann (ed.), Associates of Sherlock Holmes, Titan Books, 2016, 
The Noble Burglar, in George Mann (ed.), Further Associates of Sherlock Holmes, Titan Books, 2017, 
 The Adventure of the Deadly Séance, in Martin Rosenstock (ed.), Sherlock Holmes: The Sign of Seven, Titan Books, 2019, 
 The Manifestations of Sherlock Holmes (collection of 12 short stories), Titan Books, 2020,

Firefly 
 Big Damn Hero, Titan Books 2018,  (original story concept by Nancy Holder)
 The Magnificent Nine, Titan Books 2019, 
 The Ghost Machine, Titan Books 2020, 
 Life Signs, Titan Books 2021,

The Clouded World Series 
(writing as Jay Amory)
 The Fledging of Az Gabrielson (2006), 
 Pirates of the Relentless Desert (2007), 
 Darkening for a Fall (2008), 
 Empire of Chaos (2008), 
 The Wingless Boy, collecting vols. #1 and #2 (2008), 
 The Clouded World,  collecting vols. #3 and #4 (2008),

Children's books 
 The Web: Computopia, Dolphin, 1998, 
 Wings, Barrington Stoke, 2001, 
 The House of Lazarus, Barrington Stoke, 2003, 
 Ant God, Barrington Stoke, 2005, 
 Cold Keep, Barrington Stoke, 2006, 
 Kill Swap, Barrington Stoke, 2007, 
 Freerunner, Barrington Stoke, 2009, 
 Dead Brigade, Barrington Stoke 2007, 
 Warsuit 1.0, Bloomsbury Publishing PLC, 2012, 
 The Black Phone, Bloomsbury Publishing PLC, 2012,

The 5 Lords of Pain 
 The 5 Lords of Pain 1: The Lord of the Mountain, Barrington Stoke, 2010, 
 The 5 Lords of Pain 2: Lord of the Void, Barrington Stoke, 2010, 
 The 5 Lords of Pain 3: The Lord of Tears, Barrington Stoke, 2010, 
 The 5 Lords of Pain 4: The Lord of the Typhoon, Barrington Stoke, 2010, 
 The 5 Lords of Pain 5: The Lord of Fire, Barrington Stoke, 2010,

Novellas 
 The Hand that Feeds (with Peter Crowther), Maynard Sims Productions, 1999, 
 How the Other Half Lives, PS Publishing 1999, 
 Gig, PS Publishing, 2004. A double-novella,

Short story collections 
 Imagined Slights, Gollancz 2002, 
 Diversifications, PS Publishing 2010,

Non-fiction 
 Lifelines and Deadlines: Selected Nonfiction, Steel Quill Press, 2015,

References

External links
 
 
 Infinity Plus interview
 This Is Ull Interview
 Actusf Interview
 REVIEW : Age of Voodoo at Upcoming4.me

1965 births
Living people
British illustrators
People educated at Radley College
British male novelists
British speculative fiction writers
British writers of young adult literature
Military science fiction writers
Alumni of St Catherine's College, Oxford